Azam Cheema (born 1953, Faisalabad, Pakistan) is a Lashkar-e-Taiba operative who masterminded 2008 Mumbai attacks and 11 July 2006 Mumbai train bombings. In 2010, the United States Department of the Treasury announced sanctions against him just prior to Barack Obama's visit to India.  A citizen of Pakistan he was described as intelligence chief of Lashkar-e-Taiba and has been specifically involved in teaching operatives bomb making skills and skills necessary to infiltrate India.

He was sanctioned as a Specially Designated Global Terrorist under the Specially Designated Nationals and Blocked Persons List by the United States Department of the Treasury's Office of Foreign Assets Control; where his addresses are listed in Islamabad, Muzaffarabad and Bahawalpur.

References

Living people
1953 births
Lashkar-e-Taiba members
People from Faisalabad
People from Bahawalpur District
Participants in the 2008 Mumbai attacks
Fugitives wanted by India
Fugitives wanted on terrorism charges
People charged with terrorism
Specially Designated Nationals and Blocked Persons List
Individuals designated as terrorists by the United States government
Pakistani Islamists